The Florida Department of Corrections operates state prisons in the U.S. state of Florida. It has its headquarters in Florida's capital of Tallahassee.

The Florida Department of Corrections operates the third largest state prison system in the United States. It is the largest agency administered by the State of Florida, with a budget of $2.4 billion, approximately 80,000 inmates incarcerated and another 115,000+ offenders on some type of community supervision.

The Florida Department of Corrections has 143 facilities statewide, including 43 major institutions, 33 work camps, 15 Annexes, 20 work release centers and 6 road prisons/forestry camps. It has more than 23,000 employees, about three-quarters of whom are either sworn certified corrections officers or sworn certified probation officers. Florida Department of Corrections has K9 units statewide that are frequently utilized for tracking escapees and, in cases of small or rural law enforcement agencies, criminals who have fled from law enforcement or assisting in search and rescue for missing persons.

History

Florida's first penitentiary was opened in the U.S. arsenal property at Chattahoochee in 1868.

On 16 July 1967, 37 prisoners were killed by a fire at camp used by a convict road crew at Jay.

In 1983, the Florida Correctional Standards Council of the Florida Department of Corrections]was abolished, and its duty to certify corrections officers was assigned to the Police Standards Commission, the name of which was later changed to the Florida Criminal Justice Standards & Training Commission.

From 1991 to 2010, major crime rate, per capita, dropped 52%. Major crimes  include homicide, rape, robbery, burglary, aggravated assault, theft, auto theft and arson. This led, in turn, to fewer new convictions and imprisonments, leading to closure of facilities. The number of new annual admissions peaked at 42,000 in 2007. It dropped to 35,000 new admissions in 2011.

In 2013, the Florida Corrections Secretary reported that 87% of all inmates would eventually be released back into society.

Incarceration is determined by the judge on the basis of a point system. On various scoresheets, if the criminal or crime scores above 44, imprisonment is mandatory; under 22, the convict may not be imprisoned. Between the two, judges have discretion.

Death row

Florida State Prison and Union Correctional Institution each have a male death row, while Lowell Annex has the female death row. Florida State Prison houses the state's execution chamber. Unlike other prisoners, condemned prisoners wear orange overshirts. Condemned prisoners wear the same blue trousers worn by other prisoners.

When Lowell Correctional Institution opened in 1956 as the Florida Correctional Institution, it housed the female death row. The prison now known as Florida State Prison opened in 1961 as the East Annex; at the time of opening it began to house the execution chamber.
At some point the Broward Correctional Institution housed female death row inmates. Lowell Annex opened in April 2002. The female death row was moved to Lowell Annex in February 2003.

Demographics
As of 2015, 93% of the Florida state prison inmates were male and 7% were female. Of the male inmates, 47% were black non-Hispanics, 40.2% were white non-Hispanics, 12.5% were Hispanic, and under 1% were other non-Hispanics. Of the female inmates, 65% were white non-Hispanics, 30% were black non-Hispanics, 5% were Hispanic, and under 1% were other non-Hispanic.

Recidivism
In 2003, about one-third (32.8%) were returned to prison within three years of release. This dropped to 27.6% for those freed in 2008.

Juveniles
The state houses between 90-250 inmates up to the age of 17 between three state prisons during any given time with females at Lowell Correctional Institution and males at Sumter Correctional Institution or Suwannee Correctional Institution dependent on behavior.

Budget
It costs on average $19,469 per year to incarcerate an inmate in Florida. This includes $2.32 per day for 2,800 calorie meals.

2011 budget cuts
In first quarter 2011, the State of Florida announced the closing of 6 institutions in order to save up to $30 million. Three prisons, two bootcamps, and a road prison were closed. Brevard Correctional Institution, which is a youthful offender prison, Lowell Boot Camp, a youthful offender female boot camp, Sumter Basic Training Unit, a youthful offender male boot camp, Hendry Correctional Institution, the female prison Hillsborough Correctional Institution, and Tallahassee Road Prison were the institutions that were closed. No inmates were released as a result of the closing, and the employees of the closing institutions were offered jobs at other prisons. The institutions began moving inmates on April 1, 2011, and finished as of June 30, 2011. Hillsborough Correctional Institution and Sumter BTU were not closed.

Governor Rick Scott ordered a second group of prisons to be closed. The Florida Department of Corrections stated that aside from the obvious financial reasons, another reason for the closings is because of a declining prison population. The following prisons were closed:
 Broward Correctional Institution
 Demilly Correctional Institution
 Gainesville Correctional Institution
 Hillsborough Correctional Institution (large amount of pleas caused closing to be postponed after the initial closing)
 Indian River Correctional Institution
 New River Correctional Institution (both units)
 River Junction Work Camp
 Caryville Work Camp
 Hendry Work Camp
 Levy Forestry Camp

Staffing
As of June 30, 2012, the Florida Department of Corrections (FDC) had a total of 23,525. The department had 17,498 certified criminal justice officers in institutions or probation/parole offices.

The Florida Department of Corrections is constantly hiring to fill its ranks due to retirements, and turnovers. Florida Correctional Officers start at $41,600. 

FDC recruits are paid while they attend recruit training, and Officers can transfer anywhere in the State with FDC. Opportunities include K9 Team, Correctional Emergency Response Team (CERT), Rapid Response Team (RRT), and Institutional Inspectors.
15,280 Certified employees in institutions 
43 Correctional Officer Colonels 
85 Correctional Officer Majors
298 Correctional Officer Captains
426 Correctional Officer Lieutenants
4,046 Correctional Officer Sergeants 
10,382 Correctional Officers
2218 Non-institutional Staff
137 Correctional Inspectors
2,081 Correctional Probation Officers

Ranks, insignia, and uniforms

In 2017, Florida Corrections Officers changed the traditional Light Brown shirts and dark brown trousers to Gray shirts and black trousers. The polo shirt was discontinued and FDC went back to gray button up shirts with breathable backs. In 2020 the polo shirts with embroidered badges and names were again authorized in a dark gray for Officers and Sergeants, and white for Lieutenants and Captains.

Headquarters

The headquarters of the agency are in the Doyle Carlton Building in downtown Tallahassee. Some offices are in the Southwood Office Complex in Tallahassee. Starting sometime after March 22, 2011, the department moved into its current headquarters and office buildings.

At one time the agency had its headquarters at 2601 Blair Stone Road in Tallahassee.

Fallen officers
Since the establishment of the Florida Department of Corrections, 31 correctional officers have died in the line of duty. Corrections Officers are frequently placed in dangerous situations where officers have lost lives. The Department has a standing memorial to officers who have died in the line of duty at the Wakulla Correctional Institution where the fallen's names are carved into the memorial.

Criticism
There have been several recorded cases of corruption and prisoner abuse in the Florida Department of Corrections.

In 2007, the state faced lawsuits alleging "excessive as well as "malicious and sadistic" use of pepper spray," and "that its prisons subject too many inmates, including the mentally ill, to a prisoner 'warehousing' culture of unlawfully extreme isolation and deprivation, usually with little or no rehabilitation efforts to prevent recidivism."

In 2010, there was a 10-count federal indictment against sixteen individuals connected with the FDC, eleven of whom were corrections officers at the Glades Correctional Institution. The charges included "nine counts of attempting to possess cocaine with intent to distribute." The indictment alleges that the defendants "allegedly agreed to transport and did in fact transport on multiple occasions what they believed to be multi-kilo quantities of cocaine from the undercover warehouses in Miami-Dade County to locations in West Palm Beach." and that the defendants allegedly received a combined total of $145,000 through the drug scheme.

In 2010, two correctional officers at the Lancaster Correctional Institution were charged with malicious battery and cruel or inhumane punishment after an inmate collapsed in the exercise yard during routine drills. An investigation discovered that the correctional officers forced the inmate to perform strenuous exercises in the sand, heat and provided no water breaks while denying his request for medical help and failed to call for emergency help after the inmate collapsed. The inmate was in critical condition, but has since recovered.

Press reports indicate that in June 2012, a mentally ill prisoner was forced into a locked shower by staff at Dade Correctional Institution. After more than an hour in the hot water, Darren Rainey died from his injuries. The investigation is not yet complete.

See also

List of Florida state prisons
List of law enforcement agencies in Florida
Crime in Florida
Incarceration in Florida

References

External links

1821 establishments in Florida Territory
State corrections departments of the United States
Penal system in Florida
State law enforcement agencies of Florida